CBOQ may be short for:

Canadian Baptists of Ontario and Quebec
CBOQ-FM a Ottawa radio station